Phùng Chí Kiên (1901–1941) was a Vietnamese revolutionary. Kien was born Nguyễn Vĩ in Diễn Châu, Nghệ An Province. In 1926, he went to Guangzhou to be trained by Ho Chi Minh. After that he matriculated at Whampoa Military Academy. In December 1927, he joined the Guangzhou Rebellion. In 1930, Kien joined the Communist Party of Vietnam.

In 1931, Kien was caught by Japanese force in Manchukuo on the way to Soviet Union to attend the Communist University of the Toilers of the East. From 1933 to 1934, he studied at Communist University of the Toilers of the East in Moscow. In 1934, Kien went to Hong Kong where he became a member of the Central Committee of the Communist Party of Vietnam in 1935. In 1941, Kien was caught and beheaded by French in Cao Bằng Province. Presently, some roads, streets, schools, and communes or wards in Vietnam are named after him.

1901 births
1941 deaths
Members of the 1st Central Committee of the Indochinese Communist Party
People from Nghệ An province
Vietnamese expatriates in Hong Kong
Vietnamese expatriates in the Soviet Union
Viet Minh members
Vietnamese nationalists
Vietnamese revolutionaries
People executed by Vichy France
Executed Vietnamese people